The Spiral Staircase is a 1946 American psychological horror film directed by Robert Siodmak and starring Dorothy McGuire, George Brent, and Ethel Barrymore. Adapted from Ethel Lina White's British novel Some Must Watch (1933) by screenwriter Mel Dinelli, the film follows a mute young woman in an early-20th century Vermont town being terrorized by a serial killer who targets disabled women.

The film premiered in New York City on February 6, 1946. For her performance in the film, Barrymore received an Academy Award nomination for Best Supporting Actress.

Plot

In a small village in 1906 Vermont, the mute Helen attends a silent film screening in the parlor of a local inn. During the screening, a crippled woman staying at the inn is murdered in her room by a man hiding in the closet; her murder is the third in a string of serial killings in the community. Dr. Parry, a friend of Helen's, drives her to the Warren home, a large estate outside town where Helen is employed as a live-in companion for the bedridden Mrs. Warren. Also residing in the house are Mrs. Warren's stepson Albert, a local professor; her son, Steven; and a live-in staff: Mrs. Oates, a housekeeper; her husband Mr. Oates, a handyman; Blanche, a secretary who is having an affair with Steven; and Nurse Barker, Mrs. Warren's verbally-abused nurse.

At the house, a cloaked figure watches from the woods as Helen ascends the driveway. Inside, Helen finds Mrs. Oates in the kitchen, who discusses the murder and expresses fear for Helen, as the killer appears to be targeting "defenseless" women. While walking up the staircase, Helen pauses in front of a mirror to examine herself, and while doing so, the eye of an unknown person watches her from the shadows. In the midst of a rainstorm, the constable stops by and warns Albert to keep watch over Helen. After Mrs. Warren loses consciousness, Dr. Parry is summoned to the home. Nurse Barker discovers a bottle of ether has gone missing, and Albert sends Mr. Oates to retrieve some in town. Meanwhile, Mrs. Warren regains consciousness, and urges Dr. Parry to take Helen with him. He offers to take Helen to Boston and help her work through the trauma of her parents' death, which triggered her muteness. She agrees to go, and Dr. Parry makes plans to return later in the evening after completing another house call.

After an argument with Steven, Blanche asks Helen if she can leave with her that night. Helen agrees, and Blanche goes to the basement to retrieve her suitcase, where she is attacked and murdered. Helen later finds her corpse in the basement, and is confronted by Steven. Frightened that he is responsible, she locks him in a closet and flees upstairs. She attempts to wake Mrs. Oates who has passed out, drunk on brandy. Helen attempts to call Dr. Parry, but is unable to speak to the telephone operator.

Albert finds Helen frantic, and she writes on a notepad that Blanche has been murdered. As he follows Helen up the staircase to Mrs. Warren's room, Albert confesses to killing Blanche out of jealousy. He then reveals himself as the serial murderer, professing his goal of killing the "weak and imperfect of the world." Helen flees in terror, locking herself in Mrs. Warren's bedroom, where she finds Mrs. Warren unconscious. Meanwhile, the constable returns to the house, and is answered at the front door by Albert; he leaves a message for Helen letting her know that Dr. Parry is unable to return that night, and that they will have to go to Boston the following day. As the constable leaves, Helen attempts to get his attention by smashing the bedroom window, but he is unable to hear it amidst the wind and thunder. Helen returns to the basement to free Steven, but finds Albert waiting in hiding. He chases her as she ascends the staircase to the second floor, but the two are met by Mrs. Warren, armed with a gun. Mrs. Warren shoots Albert multiple times in the chest, killing him, and in the midst of the gunfire, Helen screams in horror.
 
Mrs. Warren orders Helen to retrieve Steven, and she frees him from the basement closet. Mrs. Warren embraces Steven, and dies on the staircase in his arms. Downstairs, Helen emotionally calls Dr. Parry on the telephone—she is now able to fully speak.

Cast
 Dorothy McGuire as Helen
 George Brent as Professor Albert Warren
 Ethel Barrymore as Mrs. Warren
 Kent Smith as Dr. Parry
 Gordon Oliver as Steven Warren
 Rhonda Fleming as Blanche
 Elsa Lanchester as Mrs. Oates
 Sara Allgood as Nurse Barker
 Rhys Williams as Mr. Oates
 James Bell as Constable
 Erville Alderson as Dr. Harvey (uncredited) 
 Robert Siodmak as The Killer's 'Eye' (uncredited)

Analysis
Since its release, The Spiral Staircase has been subject to significant film criticism and academic discussion, particularly in regard to the film's visual motifs and blending of horror and film noir. Although characterized by contemporaneous press as a "mystery romance," the film has been noted by contemporary critics for its prominent Gothic horror elements. It has also been cited as one of numerous progenitors to the slasher film, specifically for its female-centric cast and point-of-view cinematography deployed during scenes in which the killer stalks his victims.

Film scholar Amy Golden notes several significant visual allusions in the film, such as Luis Buñuel's Un chien andalou (1929) and Maya Deren's Meshes of the Afternoon (1943). Golden cites the film as a "quintessential example of 1940s horror." Writer Denis Grunes in 2007 suggested the film is "in fact a masked allegory of the passage of silent cinema into sound," citing the mute protagonist's predicament as evidence. This notion was also suggested by film scholar Amy Lawrence in her 1991 book Echo and Narcissus: Women's Voices in Classical Hollywood Cinema.

Production

Conception
Adapted from the Ethel Lina White novel Some Must Watch (1933), The Spiral Staircase was screenwriter Mel Dinelli's first screenplay. RKO Pictures had acquired the rights to produce the film from independent producer David O. Selznick, who himself purchased the rights to White's novel; Selznick had originally conceived a film adaptation with Ingrid Bergman in the lead role. Selznick sold the rights to the project (along with several others he owned) to RKO in order to help finance the Western Duel in the Sun (1946). Under the terms of the sale, Selznick was given a back end cut of the film's earnings, and subsequently gave star Dorothy McGuire a convertible as a bonus for appearing in the film. The original working title for the project was The Silence of Helen McCord.

When writing the screenplay, Dinelli received input from Dore Schary, who was recommended by Selznick. In the early stages of Dinelli's writing, it was decided to change the setting from England to New England in the United States, which Dinelli and Schary both decided would lend a Gothic tone to the story. The spiral staircase featured in the script (from which the title of the film takes its name) also featured in White's original novel.

Filming
The film was shot between August through October 1945 on the RKO Studio lot in Los Angeles, California. Cinematographer Nicholas Musuraca was hired to shoot the film; he had previously shot several low-budget films for Val Lewton at RKO, such as Cat People (1942), The Seventh Victim (1943), and The Curse of the Cat People (1944).

Musuraca employed several techniques to achieve the film's chiaroscuro-inspired compositions, which included shooting at low angles to achieve the appearance of deep shadows onscreen. In order to conceal the killer's identity, Musuraca shot director Siodmak's eyes for the close-up shots of the killer watching Helen. On October 10, 1945, toward the end of the shoot, the film's assistant director, Harry Scott, died.

Release
The Spiral Staircase premiered in New York City on February 6, 1946. This was followed by a national theatrical run, during which the film screened in various cities across the United States during the late-winter and early-spring months of 1946. During its theatrical run, the film managed to gross $885,000.

Critical reception
Variety wrote, "This is a smooth production of an obvious, though suspenseful murder thriller, ably acted and directed. Mood and pace are well set, and story grips throughout." Bosley Crowther of The New York Times wrote, "This is a shocker, plain and simple, and whatever pretensions it has to psychological drama may be considered merely as a concession to a currently popular fancy." During its local theatrical runs, the film earned reviews in various local press: A review in the Pittsburgh Press called the film a "blood-and-thunder melodrama...done so well except that it tends to be tedious at times instead of tense, so leisurely is it paced that it works up considerable suspense." In the Beatrice Daily Sun of Beatrice, Nebraska, it was noted: "An ingenious plot and the work of a superb cast lend distinction to The Spiral Staircase," with the film being ultimately deemed as "gripping." A review published in the Corvallis Gazette-Times of Corvallis, Oregon, summarized: 

Contemporary author and film critic Leonard Maltin awarded the film three and a half out of a possible four stars, calling it "[a] Superb Hitchock-like thriller with [an] unforgettable performance by McGuire". Pauline Kael praised the film's establishment of characters, noting that it "has all the trappings of the genre...but the psychopaths are quite presentable people, and this, plus the skillful, swift direction, makes the terror convincing."

A review published in the Time Out film guide called the film a "superb thriller," concluding: "Hitchcock couldn't have bettered the casual mastery with which the opening defines not just time and place (small town, turn of the century) but the themes of voyeurism and entrapment." Film scholar Andrew Spicer praised the film's cinematography, calling it "the most beautifully crafted of Siodmak's films, superbly paced with the suspense steadily accumulating in intensity aided by the expressive cinematography of Nicholas Musuraca." Tom Milne of the Time Out Film Guide called the film "one of the undoubted masterpieces of the Gothic mode."

Ethel Barrymore was nominated for Best Supporting Actress at the 19th Academy Awards.

Home media
The Spiral Staircase was released on VHS and DVD in 2000 by Anchor Bay Entertainment. It was re-released on DVD by Metro-Goldwyn-Mayer in 2005 after the studio and its catalogue were acquired by Sony Pictures. In 2018 the film was released on Blu-ray in the US by Kino Lorber under license from Walt Disney Studios Motion Pictures, which owns this film as part of the David O. Selznick library.

Adaptations
The novel was adapted for a radio production starring Helen Hayes before reaching the screen.

The Spiral Staircase was adapted as a half-hour radio play on the November 25, 1949, broadcast of Screen Director's Playhouse, starring Dorothy McGuire in her original role.

In 1964, a televised adaptation starring Elizabeth Montgomery and Lillian Gish was released. It was remade again in 1975 as The Spiral Staircase with Jacqueline Bisset,  and again as a 2000 TV film The Spiral Staircase with Nicollette Sheridan.

Notes

References

Works cited

External links
 
 
 
 
 The Spiral Staircase on the Screen Directors Playhouse (November 25, 1949) at the Internet Archive

1946 films
1946 horror films
1946 mystery films
1940s psychological thriller films
1940s psychological horror films
1940s serial killer films
American black-and-white films
American mystery films
American psychological thriller films
American psychological horror films
1940s English-language films
Film noir
Films scored by Roy Webb
Films set in 1906
Films set in country houses
Films set in Vermont
Films shot in Los Angeles
Films based on British novels
Films based on mystery novels
Films directed by Robert Siodmak
Murder in films
Period horror films
RKO Pictures films
1940s American films